Milwaukie High School is a public high school located in Milwaukie, Oregon, United States. It is one of seven high schools within the North Clackamas School District. The school's mascot is the mustang, and its colors are maroon and gold.

History 

Milwaukie High School dates back to 1907. The first building was replaced in 1925. The current Gym was rebuilt following the Columbus Day storm in 1962.
The 1925 structure was deemed unsafe therefore it was demolished in 2018, and rebuilt in the same location with a similar footprint painted in the classic North Clackamas Grey and Tan. Along with a new building, the Gym and Commons (built in 1995) were remodeled including a newly designed gym floor and modern lighting. The school operated for two years in modulars, once removed a new track & field were installed.
The new building was finished in the fall of 2020, with students slated to return amidst the COVID-19 pandemic in 2021. The new main building was dedicated with a ribbon cutting ceremony on October 8, 2021.

The school's first mascot, the Maroon, fell into disfavor with students because of its similarity to the word "moron." The student body voted on a new mascot and as a result the mustang was chosen.

In 2005, the school added the Milwaukie Academy of the Arts to its campus. This charter school operates in conjunction with Milwaukie High School's main campus to offer a full course catalog. The school focuses on integrating the arts into core school subject areas.

Reconstruction
In 2008, the JC Lillie Center for the Arts, the school's performing arts center, underwent a major esthetic and structural renovation, which included a redeveloped entrance and courtyard, remodeled auditorium, and a notoriously faulty sound system.

In June 2018, the main campus of the school was demolished to make space for a new academic building. Construction of the new structure started in early September 2018, and is scheduled for completion in August 2021. The new facility will address many the previous structure's issues, including overcrowding, and safety concerns. The new facility was designed by the IBI Group and BRIC Architecture and is being constructed by Skanska.

Until the campus redevelopment concluded, students practiced academics in modular structures located on the school's football field, which was renovated once the academic building reopens and the structures were removed. The school unofficially named the temporary academic structures "Mod City".

Living History Day
Since 1996, Milwaukie High School has annually hosted the nationally recognized  Living History Day. On this day thousands of veterans are welcomed into the school to help educate students about past wars, and provide first-hand accounts of military experiences. Unfortunately, this was cut in 2010 to lack of funding and staffing reductions.

Academics
In 2014, out of 260 seniors, 220 graduated, for an 83% graduation rate.

Athletics
Milwaukie High School has competed in the Northwest Oregon Conference at the 5A classification since 2010.

The dance team, the Pony Prancers, won first place in their division at the OSAA State Championships in 1986, 1996, 2011, 2012 and 2016.
The Mustangs have two state wrestling titles. 1973 and 1984.

Notable alumni 
Dorothy Hester Stenzel, stunt pilot
Latin Berry, former NFL player
 Kendrick Bourne, professional football player for the New England Patriots 
 Dustin Corea, American-born Salvadorian professional soccer player
 Brad Ecklund, former NFL player and coach
 Gary Gordon, co-inventor of the modern optical computer mouse
 Tonya Harding, figure skating champion (dropped out)
 Keynan Middleton, professional baseball player for the Los Angeles Angels
 Jerry Zimmerman, professional baseball player and coach

References

1907 establishments in Oregon
Educational institutions established in 1907
High schools in Clackamas County, Oregon
Milwaukie, Oregon
Public high schools in Oregon